Áine Brady (born 8 September 1954) is a former Irish Fianna Fáil politician who served as a Minister of State from 2009 to 2011. She was a Teachta Dála (TD) for the Kildare North constituency from 2007 to 2011.

Áine Kitt was Fianna Fáil's youth organiser in the early 1980s, and a member of the party national executive. Her first electoral outing was at the 1981 election to the 15th Seanad, when she stood unsuccessfully on the Cultural and Educational Panel.

She was a teacher at Scoil na Mainistreach in Celbridge for 22 years. She was an unsuccessful candidate for Dáil Éireann at the Kildare North by-election in 2005, but won a seat at the 2007 general election.

Brady is the sister of former Fianna Fáil chief whip Tom Kitt and of former Minister of State Michael P. Kitt, and the daughter of former TD Michael F. Kitt. She is married to former TD Gerry Brady, they have four children.

On 22 April 2009, as part of a junior ministerial reshuffle, Brady was appointed as Minister of State at the Departments of Health and Children, Social and Family Affairs and the Environment, Heritage and Local Government, with special responsibility for Older People and Health Promotion.

She lost her seat at the 2011 general election.

Brady and her husband attended the 2020 Oireachtas Golf Society Dinner.

See also
 Families in the Oireachtas

References

1954 births
Living people
Fianna Fáil TDs
Irish schoolteachers
Aine
Members of the 30th Dáil
Ministers of State of the 30th Dáil
Politicians from County Galway
Spouses of Irish politicians
Women ministers of state of the Republic of Ireland
Alumni of University College Dublin
21st-century women Teachtaí Dála